The Alms and Doepke Dry Goods Company is a historic commercial building in Cincinnati, Ohio, United States.  Located along Central Parkway on the edge of downtown, it is a late Victorian structure designed by Samuel Hannaford, a renowned Cincinnati architect.

William F. Doepke, with his first cousins, William H. Alms, and Frederick H. Alms, established a dry goods store in Cincinnati in 1865 and moved to the northeastern corner of the intersection of Main Street and the Miami and Erie Canal two years later.  Starting in 1878, they erected the core of the present structure at that location; it would later be expanded in 1886, 1890, and 1906.  Seven-stories tall, it is a brick building with a stone foundation and a slate roof.  Major architectural elements include an ornate cornice with heavy bracketing and its Mansard roof that is pierced by many dormers.

By the late nineteenth century, Alms and Doepke had built a reputation as the region's leading dry goods firm; eight hundred individuals were on its payroll in 1891.  When the company chose to expand their facilities in 1886, they hired Samuel Hannaford, who by that time had become Cincinnati's most prestigious architect.  During the 1870s and 1880s, Hannaford independently designed a wide range of buildings throughout Cincinnati and its suburbs, becoming known as the architect of choice for prosperous individuals and companies of the Gilded Age.

After ninety years of operation, Alms and Doepke closed permanently in 1955.  Their headquarters endured after their demise; its architecture was sufficiently well preserved to qualify the building for inclusion on the National Register of Historic Places in 1980, along with dozens of other Hannaford buildings.  Three years later, it was one of more than two thousand buildings in the Over-the-Rhine neighborhood added to the Register together as a historic district, the Over-the-Rhine Historic District.  Today, the Alms and Doepke Dry Goods Company building is owned by the Hamilton County government, which uses it as offices for its Job and Family Services and human resources departments, as it is located across Central Parkway from the Hamilton County Courthouse.

References

Retail companies established in 1865
Retail companies disestablished in 1955
County government buildings in Ohio
Commercial buildings on the National Register of Historic Places in Ohio
National Register of Historic Places in Cincinnati
Office buildings in Cincinnati
Retail buildings in Ohio
U.S. Route 42
Victorian architecture in Ohio
Historic district contributing properties in Ohio
Commercial buildings completed in 1878
1865 establishments in Ohio
1955 disestablishments in Ohio